Sewal may refer to:

Given name
Sewal Fraunceys, English politician
Sewal de Bovil

Places
Sewal, Iowa
Sewal, Indiana